Minority may refer to:

Politics
 Minority government, formed when a political party does not have a majority of overall seats in parliament
 Minority leader, in American politics, the floor leader of the second largest caucus in a legislative body

Society
Minor (law), legal category of people under the age of majority
Age of majority, the threshold of adulthood as recognized or declared in law
Legal age, age at which a person may legally engage in a certain activity
 Minority group, a category of people differentiated from the social majority (e.g. ethnic minority)
 Sexual minority, a group whose sexual identity, orientation or practices differ from the majority of society

Music
 "Minority" (Gigi Gryce song), a 1953 jazz standard
 "Minority" (Green Day song), a 2000 punk rock song
 "Minority", a song by the Subhumans from their 1983 album The Day the Country Died

Other uses
 Minority (philosophy), concept coined by philosopher Gilles Deleuze and Félix Guattari

See also

 Majority (disambiguation)
 Minority Party (disambiguation)
 Minority Report (disambiguation)
 Minority rights, individual and collective rights of minority groups
 Ethnic group, an ethnicity
 Minority influence, a form of social influence
 Minority language, a language spoken by a minority of the population 
 Minority-serving institution, a term in American higher education
 Minority business enterprise, American business term
 Minority interest, in business
 Majority minority (American), where one or more racial/ethnic minorities make up a majority of population 
 List of majority minority United States congressional districts
 Visible minority (Canadian), persons, other than aboriginal peoples, who are non-Caucasian in race or non-white in colour

Social science disambiguation pages